Rowde is a village and civil parish in the English county of Wiltshire, on the A342 about  northwest of Devizes. The parish includes the hamlet of Tanis.

History
The village now mainly consists of modern brick-built houses, but a number of 17th-century buildings still remain in the centre of the village, including the George & Dragon public house. This was pre-dated in the village by another pub, a timber framed and thatched building that was destroyed by fire in 1938; a replacement, the Cross Keys now stands in its place.

On the outskirts of Rowde are the Caen Hill flight of locks of the Kennet and Avon Canal. The canal rises 237 feet by means of 29 locks, 16 of them in a straight line at Caen Hill. The canal was constructed between 1794 and 1810 and served to link Devizes with Bristol and London. It fell into disuse after the coming of the railway but has been restored, and is now used for leisure purposes.

Amenities
The parish has a village hall, built in 1887 as Rowde Reading Room and Coffee Tavern.

Rowde C of E Primary Academy serves Rowde and nearby villages. Built in 2006, it replaced a school in Marsh Lane which was built in 1841 and extended in 1907. Silverwood School, to the north of the village, is a Special Needs school built around a country house of 1812.

The Church of England parish church is dedicated to St. Matthew and has a 15th-century tower, the rest having been rebuilt in 1832–3 to designs of Henry Goodridge. It has a font designed in 1850 by Sir Matthew Digby Wyatt, architect, who was born in Rowde and lived for a time at Rowdeford House (now the home of Silverwood School). The six bells in the tower were cast in 1870 by John Taylor & Co. The building was Grade II* listed in 1962. Today the parish is part of the Rowde and Bromham benefice, which also covers Sandy Lane.

Local government
Rowde is a civil parish with an elected parish council. It is in the area of the Wiltshire Council unitary authority, which is responsible for all significant local government functions. In the 2001 census, the district ward of Bromham & Rowde had a population of 2,880 persons.

Former railway
The Devizes Branch Line was built through the parish in 1857 and a small station – Bromham and Rowde Halt – was added in 1909 at Sells Green, to the west just outside the parish. The line was closed in 1966.

References

External links 

 Village website
 Photos of Rowde and surrounding area at Geograph

Villages in Wiltshire
Civil parishes in Wiltshire